Elsie Roy Elementary is a public elementary school in Vancouver, and part of School District 39 Vancouver. It is located along the waterfront of Yaletown and is the first new elementary school to be opened in an inner-city Vancouver neighbourhood since 1975.

It is a member of the "Downtown Family of Schools" with King George Secondary School, Lord Roberts Elementary School, Lord Roberts Annex, and Crosstown Elementary. Elsie Roy is also part of the Middle Years Baccalaureate with King George Secondary and Lord Roberts Elementary.

Over the past few years, Elsie Roy has invested in various educational technology for its staff, teachers and students. In 2010, with the launch of the Elsie Roy iPad Project, the school has built an environment including corner-to-corner Wi-Fi, smartboards in every classroom and library, netbooks, iPods, iPads, Microsoft Surfaces and cloud based education software including Moodle and other sites. The iPad Project has resulted in the creation of the Elsie Roy Tech Program where students learn the environment and provide in class support to their teachers and staff.

As of 2008 the school has been criticized for being overcrowded.

References

External links

 Class Size
 Satisfaction Survey
 School Performance
 Skills Assessment

Elementary schools in Vancouver